The Duchy of Salzburg was a Cisleithanian crown land of the Austrian Empire and Austria-Hungary from 1849 to 1918. Its capital was Salzburg, while other towns in the duchy included Zell am See and Gastein. Before becoming a crown land, Salzburg went through numerous changes of rulership.

History 
In the course of the German mediatization of 1803, the Prince-archbishopric of Salzburg, an ecclesiastical State of the Holy Roman Empire, was secularized as the Electorate of Salzburg, ruled by the Habsburg archduke Ferdinand III of Austria. However, two years later, this short-lived principality was annexed by the newly established Austrian Empire according to the Peace of Pressburg and Ferdinand received the Grand Duchy of Würzburg in compensation. The electoral title became obsolete with the Empire's dissolution in 1806.

After the end of the Napoleonic Wars and the 1816 Treaty of Munich, the Salzburg lands came back to Austria, with the exception of the share on the left bank of the Salzach river, the so-called Rupertiwinkel, which, like the former Prince-Provostry of Berchtesgaden, remained in Bavaria. Some smaller areas in the Ziller and Defereggen valleys fell to Tyrol; the town of Friesach was ceded to Carinthia. The decreased significance led to emigration and economic crises. On the other hand, the remote province developed as a tourist destination, mainly for Alpinists like Archduke John of Austria.

After the Revolutions of 1848, the Salzburg territory was again separated from Upper Austria and became a new crown land in its own right, the Duchy of Salzburg, by resolution of 26 June 1849. Caroline Augusta of Bavaria, widow of the late Emperor Francis I of Austria, chose the city of Salzburg as her residence. According to the 1861 February Patent, the duchy received a  diet. After the Austro-Hungarian Compromise of 1867, it belonged to the Cisleithanian (Austrian) part of Austria-Hungary.

With the fall of the Austro-Hungarian Monarchy in 1918, the duchy was succeeded by the state of Salzburg, part of first German Austria and then the First Austrian Republic.

References 

 Duchy
History of Salzburg
States and territories established in 1849
States and territories disestablished in 1918
1849 establishments in the Austrian Empire
Salzburg
Salz